The Embassy of the Federal Republic of Nigeria in Moscow is the diplomatic mission of Nigeria in the Russian Federation. The embassy is also accredited to Belarus. It is located at №5[Malaya Mamonovsky Pereulok]] in the Central Administrative District of Moscow. The current ambassador is Abdullahi Yibaikwal Shehu.

See also 
 Nigeria–Russia relations
 Diplomatic missions in Russia

References

External links 
 Embassy of Nigeria in Moscow

Nigeria–Russia relations
Nigeria
Moscow
Nigeria–Soviet Union relations